In human anatomy, arcuate foramen, also known as ponticulus posticus (Latin for "little posterior bridge") or Kimmerle's anomaly, refers to a bony bridge on the atlas (C1 vertebra) that covers the groove for the vertebral artery.  It is a common anatomical variation and estimated to occur in approximately 3-15% of the population. It occurs in females more commonly than males. The ponticulus posticus is created through ossification of the posterior atlantooccipital ligament.

Pathology
The presence of arcuate foramen is associated with headache, musculoskeletal pain and vertebrobasilar stroke.

References

External links

Skeletal system
Human head and neck